Čierna Lehota is a village and municipality in the Bánovce nad Bebravou District of the Trenčín Region of Slovakia.

Genealogical resources

The records for genealogical research are available at the state archive "Statny Archiv in Nitra, Slovakia"

 Roman Catholic church records (births/marriages/deaths): 1744-1942 (parish B)
 Lutheran church records (births/marriages/deaths): 1732-1935 (parish B)

See also
 List of municipalities and towns in Slovakia

References

External links

  Official page
Surnames of living people in Cierna Lehota

Villages and municipalities in Bánovce nad Bebravou District